The Australian women's national rugby union team, also known as the Wallaroos, did not compete in the first two Rugby World Cups in 1991 and 1994. They made their first World Cup appearance in 1998, in the Netherlands, and finished in fifth place. The Wallaroos have competed in every tournament since their debut. They made the semi-finals for the first time in 2010 and finished with their best result of third-place.

Australia will host their first Women's Rugby World Cup in 2029.

By position

1998 Rugby World Cup

Knockout stage

2002 Rugby World Cup

Knockout stage

2006 Rugby World Cup 

Pool B ⇔ Pool C

Knockout stage

2010 Rugby World Cup

Knockout stage

2014 Rugby World Cup

Knockout stage

2017 Rugby World Cup

Knockout stage

2021 Rugby World Cup

Knockout stage

Overall record 
Overall record against all nations in the World Cup:

References

External links 

 Official site of the Rugby World Cup.
 Official site of World Rugby.

Australia women at the Rugby World Cup
Australia women's national rugby union team